Paul Karl Wilhelm Scheerbart (8 January 1863 in Danzig – 15 October 1915 in Berlin) was a German author of speculative fiction literature and drawings. He was also published under the pseudonym Kuno Küfer and is best known for the book Glasarchitektur (1914).

Scheerbart was associated with expressionist architecture and one of its leading proponents, Bruno Taut. He composed aphoristic poems about glass for the Taut's Glass Pavilion at the Werkbund Exhibition (1914).

Life 

Paul Scheerbart began studies of philosophy and history of art in 1885. In 1887 he worked as a poet in Berlin and tried to invent Perpetual motion machines.  In 1892 he was one of the joint founders of the Verlag deutscher Phantasten (Publishers of German Fantasists).

At this time he was in financial difficulties. After writing in different publications he produced his first novel 'Die große Revolution' (The Great Revolution), which was published by the Insel-Verlag. The young Ernst Rowohlt published Scheerbart's bizarre poem collection Katerpoesie and became his friend.

Scheerbart's fantasy essays about glass architecture influenced architects at that time, including the young Bruno Taut. Among his Berlin friends and drinking circle was Erich Mühsam,  who dedicated a chapter to Scheerbart in his 'Unpolitical Memories' and Richard Dehmel. Scheerbart was also an important influence on Walter Benjamin who quoted his ideas on glass in his Arcades Project.

Work 

"Scheerbart published a long succession of fantasy novels, articles, and poems between 1889 and his death in 1915, in which he insisted that the universe is far too rich and complex to be comprehended by reason alone. Only naive wonder — the basis of the sublime — could promote the development of higher forms of understanding."

Very few of Scheerbart's works have been translated into English. Though the following list also gives English translations of the titles, there is usually no English-language edition of the work available.

 1889 Das Paradies. Die Heimat der Kunst (Paradise. Home of the Arts)
 1893 Ja... was... möchten wir nicht Alles!, (Yes.....What......We wouldn't all like to have!), A Fable 
 1897 Ich liebe Dich!, (I love you!), A Novel with 66 Intermezzos
 1897 Tarub, Bagdads berühmte Köchin, (Tarub, Baghdad's famous female cook), Arab culture novel 
 1897 Der Tod der Barmekiden, (The death of the Barmakids), Arab Harem novel 
 1898 Na prost!, (Well, Cheers!), Fantasy King novel
 1900 Die wilde Jagd, (The wild hunt), A development novel in eight stories 
 1901 Rakkóx der Billionär, (Rakkóx the trillionaire),  An ostentatious novel
 1901 Die Seeschlange (The Sea Serpent), A sea novel
 1902 Die große Revolution, (The Great Revolution), A moon novel
 1902 Immer mutig!, (Always courageously!), A Fantasy novel
 1902 Liwûna und Kaidôh, A Soul novel
 1902 Weltglanz, (World Shine), a sun fairy tale 
 1903 Kometentanz, (Comet dance), Astral Pantomime in two acts
 1903 Der Aufgang zur Sonne, (The stairway to the sun), house fairy tales 
 1904 Der Kaiser von Utopia, (The emperor of Utopia), a folktale 
 1904 Machtspäße, (Jests about power), Arab novellas 
 1904 Revolutionäre Theater-Bibliothek, (Revolutionary theatre library), collection of plays 
 1906 Münchhausen und Clarissa, Berlin novel
 1907 Jenseits-Galeri
 1909 Die Entwicklung des Luftmilitarismus und die Auflösung der europäischen Land-Heere, Festungen und Seeflotten, (translated into English as The Development of Aerial Militarism and the Demobilization of European Ground Forces, Fortresses, and Naval Fleets, Brooklyn, New York: Ugly Duckling Presse, 2007, Series: Lost Literature #4, translated by M. Kasper) 1909 Kater-Poesie, (translatable as Tomcat poetry or Hangover poetry), poems 
 1910 Das Perpetuum mobile, Die Geschichte einer Erfindung (translated into English as The perpetual motion machine: The story of an invention, Cambridge, Massachusetts: Wakefield Press, 2011) 
 1912 Das große Licht, (The Great Light) A Munchausen–Breviary 
 1912 Flora Mohr, A glass flower novella
 1913 Lesabéndio, an Asteroid novel ; English translation, Cambridge, Massachusetts: Wakefield Press, 2012
 1914 Das graue Tuch und zehn Prozent Weiß, (The grey cloth and ten percent of white), a ladies novel. Translated into English as: The Gray Cloth: Paul Scheerbart's Novel on Glass Architecture. Cambridge, Massachusetts ; London, England : MIT Press, 2001.  
 1914 Glasarchitektur (Glass architecture)
 1921 Von Zimmer zu Zimmer, (From room to room), letters to his wife

Notes

References
 Josiah McElheny and Christine Burgin eds.: Glass! Love!! Perpetual Motion!!!: A Paul Scheerbart Reader. Chicago, University of Chicago Press, 2014. 
 Josiah McElheny: The Light Club: On Paul Scheerbart's The Light Club of Batavia. Chicago, University of Chicago Press, 2010. 
 Timothy Benson et al.: Expressionist Utopias. Berkeley, University of California Press, 2001. 
  Mechthild Rausch: Von Danzig ins Weltall. Paul Scheerbarts Anfangsjahre (1863–1895). München: Ed. Text und Kritik 1997.   
  Uli Kohnle: Paul Scheerbart. Eine Bibliographie. Bellheim: Edition Phantasia 1994.  
  Rosemarie Bletter: "Paul Scheerbart's Architectural Fantasies," Journal of Architectural Historians 34 (May 1975).
  Paul Kaltefleiter, Berni Lörwald und Michael M. Schardt (Hrsg.): Über Paul Scheerbart. 100 Jahre Scheerbart-Rezeption''. 3 Bände. Paderborn: Igel-Verlag 1998.  (Band 1);  (Band 2);  (Band 3).

External links 
 
  
 Scheerbart bei Edition Phantasia 
 ub.fu-berlin.de University library of the Universität Berlin 
 Project Gutenberg -- Germany 
 
 
 

1863 births
1915 deaths
German poets
Expressionist architecture
German science fiction writers
German fantasy writers
Writers from Gdańsk
People from the Province of Prussia
German male poets